George Faulkner (15 January 1888 – 13 October 1974) was a British wrestler. He competed in two events at the 1908 Summer Olympics.

References

External links
 

1888 births
1974 deaths
British male sport wrestlers
Olympic wrestlers of Great Britain
Wrestlers at the 1908 Summer Olympics
Place of birth missing